Édgar Arnulfo Robles Coronel (22 November 1977 – 28 December 2016), known as Edgar Robles, was a Paraguayan footballer who played for Club 12 de Octubre of the Primera División in Paraguay.

Teams
  Sportivo San Lorenzo 2000
  Libertad 2001–2004
  3 de Febrero 2005
  Libertad 2006–2010
  Sol de América 2010
  Olimpia Asunción 2011
  Sportivo Luqueño 2012–2013
  12 de Octubre 2014–2016

Titles
  Libertad 2002, 2003, 2006 and 2007 (Paraguayan Primera División Championship), 2008 (Torneo Apertura & Clausura Paraguayan Primera División Championship)

Notes

References

External links
 
 
 

1977 births
2016 deaths
Paraguayan footballers
Paraguayan Primera División players
Club Atlético 3 de Febrero players
Club Olimpia footballers
Club Libertad footballers
Club Sol de América footballers
Sportivo Luqueño players
Club Sportivo San Lorenzo footballers
Association football midfielders
Paraguay international footballers